Peter Mazan (born 13 May 1990) is a Slovak professional footballer who currently plays for Pohronie. 

In the summer of 2021, he became the captain of Pohronie, but was released in January 2022.

He previously played for Dukla Banská Bystrica, AS Trenčín or Raków Częstochowa.

Career statistics

References

External links
AS Trenčín profile

1990 births
Living people
Sportspeople from Bojnice
Slovak footballers
Slovak expatriate footballers
Slovakia under-21 international footballers
Association football forwards
AS Trenčín players
FC Baník Prievidza players
FC ViOn Zlaté Moravce players
FK Dukla Banská Bystrica players
MFK Skalica players
Raków Częstochowa players
Radomiak Radom players
FK Pohronie players
Slovak Super Liga players
II liga players
2. Liga (Slovakia) players
Slovak expatriate sportspeople in Poland
Expatriate footballers in Poland